Pragelato Plan is a cross-country skiing venue located in Pragelato, Italy. It hosted the cross-country skiing and the cross-country skiing portion of the Nordic combined events for the 2006 Winter Olympics in neighboring Turin.

References
2006 Winter Olympics official report. Volume 3. pp. 72–3.

Venues of the 2006 Winter Olympics
Olympic cross-country skiing venues
Olympic Nordic combined venues
Ski areas and resorts in Italy
Sports venues in Italy